Karol Józef Teofil Estreicher (22 November 1827 in Kraków – 30 September 1908 in Kraków) was a Polish bibliographer and librarian who was a founder of the Polish Academy of Learning. While he is known as the "father of Polish bibliography", he is also considered the founder of the bibliographical method in literary research.
His "monumental work",  is called the "most outstanding bibliography of Polish books, and probably one of the most famous bibliographies in the world".

After completing university studies in philosophy and law, he worked in the judiciary in Kraków and Lviv, where bibliography became his passion.
Margrave Aleksander Wielopolski appointed him in 1862 as under-librarian and assistant professor of Bibliography at the  where he presented Bibliography for the first time as a standalone discipline.
In 1868 he returned to Kraków and became director of the Jagiellonian Library where during a 37-year tenure he modernized and tripled its collection.

He was also an author, historian, literary critic, journalist, and theater critic.

Works or publications

References

1827 births
1908 deaths
Academic staff of Jagiellonian University
Polish literary critics
Polish literary historians
Bibliophiles
Polish book and manuscript collectors